Lisa and Lena Mantler (born June 17, 2002) are identical twins from Stuttgart, Germany. They make short videos, especially of lip syncing, on social media outlets such as TikTok, Instagram and Twitter.

Career 
Lisa and Lena started making videos on 16 December 2015 on the app musical.ly, the predecessor of TikTok. They gained notoriety on the social media platform, becoming the #1 most-followed account on TikTok. Later they announced that they would be deleting their TikTok account due to loss of interest in the platform and not wanting to support an unsafe app. On 31 March 2019, they deleted their page. They had over 32.7 million followers. They rejoined TikTok on 7 May 2020, with the same username @lisaandlena. They amassed over 2.5 million followers and 12.6 million likes in just 24 hours of re-joining the app.

As of 11 October 2022, Lisa and Lena have over 13.6 million followers on their new TikTok account, 18.4 million followers on Instagram, 919k YouTube subscribers, 154.9k Twitter followers, and 16k Twitch followers. Lisa and Lena are inactive on YouTube, Twitter and Twitch.

Lisa and Lena launched their clothing brand, J1MO71, on 5 December 2016. They started teasing their new brand by posting to the J1MO71 Instagram account on 3 November 2016. They signed with WME in July 2017 and released their first single, Not My Fault, on 26 July 2017. This promoted their recently released clothing brand. The music video was deleted from their YouTube channel.

Awards 
In 2016 the duo received the golden Bravo Otto as Social-Media-Stars. They also received a 2017 Shorty Award as Muser of the Year. They were nominated for Best Musers and Choice Musers at the 2017 Teen Choice Awards.

Personal life 
Lisa and Lena are Christians. They were adopted at the age of six months. Lena was born just before Lisa.

References

External links 
 
 

Twin actresses
People from Stuttgart
German twins
2002 births
German Christians
Living people
TikTokers
German adoptees
German bloggers
German women bloggers
German Internet celebrities
Social media influencers